István Déván (4 November 1891 – 20 April 1977) was a Hungarian track and field athlete and cross-country skier who competed for Hungary in the 1912 Summer Olympics and in the 1924 Winter Olympics.

He was born in Pressburg (Pozsony), Austria-Hungary (today Bratislava, Slovakia) and died in Kempten im Allgäu, West Germany.

In 1912 he was eliminated in the semifinals of the 200 metres competition. He also participated in the 400 metres event but was eliminated in the first round. He was also a member of the Hungarian team which was eliminated in the first round of the 4x400 metre relay competition.

Twelve years later he participated in the first Winter Olympics and finished 31st in the 18 km cross-country skiing event.

References

External links
 profile 

1890s births
1977 deaths
Sportspeople from Bratislava
Hungarian male sprinters
Hungarian male cross-country skiers
Hungarian male Nordic combined skiers
Olympic athletes of Hungary
Olympic cross-country skiers of Hungary
Olympic Nordic combined skiers of Hungary
Athletes (track and field) at the 1912 Summer Olympics
Cross-country skiers at the 1924 Winter Olympics
Nordic combined skiers at the 1924 Winter Olympics
Hungarians in Slovakia